The third season of the American television series Legends of Tomorrow, which is based on characters from DC Comics, premiered on The CW on October 10, 2017, and ran for 18 episodes until April 9, 2018. The season follows the Legends, a dysfunctional team of time-traveling superheroes and anti-heroes, and their mission to correct anachronisms in time that they unintentionally caused. It is set in the Arrowverse, sharing continuity with the other television series of the universe, and is a spin-off of Arrow and The Flash. The season is produced by Berlanti Productions, Warner Bros. Television, and DC Entertainment, with Phil Klemmer serving as showrunners.

The season was ordered in January 2017. Production began that July and ended in February 2018. Principal cast members Victor Garber, Brandon Routh, Caity Lotz, Franz Drameh, Maisie Richardson-Sellers, Amy Pemberton, Nick Zano, and Dominic Purcell return from previous seasons. They are joined by new cast members Tala Ashe and The Flash alum Keiynan Lonsdale. The series was renewed for a fourth season on April 3, 2018.

Premise
The Legends find out that attempting to time travel with two versions of themselves onboard the Waverider had more of an impact on time than they thought. Due to this blunder, anachronisms have popped along the timeline; these range from objects and people. Rip Hunter's new Time Bureau (a replacement organization for the Time Masters) forces the Legends to retire and resume normal lives. However, they are forced back into action and allowed to work as deputized members of the Time Bureau; they remain unaware that Rip is planning to use their destructive and idiotic tendencies for a threat bigger than the anachronisms.

Episodes

Cast and characters

Main 
 Victor Garber as Martin Stein / Firestorm
 Brandon Routh as Ray Palmer / Atom
 Caity Lotz as Sara Lance / White Canary
 Franz Drameh as Jefferson "Jax" Jackson / Firestorm
 Maisie Richardson-Sellers as Amaya Jiwe / Vixen
 Amy Louise Pemberton as Gideon
 Tala Ashe as Zari Tomaz
 Keiynan Lonsdale as Wally West / Kid Flash
 Nick Zano as Nate Heywood / Steel
 Dominic Purcell as Mick Rory / Heat Wave

Recurring 
 Arthur Darvill as Rip Hunter
 Christina Brucato as Lily Stein
 Jes Macallan as Ava Sharpe
 Adam Tsekhman as Gary Green
 Hiro Kanagawa as Wilbur Bennett
 Tracy Ifeachor as Kuasa
 Joy Richardson as Amaya Jiwe's ancestor
 Neal McDonough as Damien Darhk
 Courtney Ford as Nora Darhk
 John Noble voices Mallus
 Noble also plays as himself
 Matt Ryan as John Constantine

Guest

Production

Development 
In January 2017, Legends of Tomorrow was renewed by The CW for a third season. Showrunner Phil Klemmer said the season would be "more in the world of the occult and monsters", unlike the first two seasons which were more science-focused.

Casting 
Returning series regulars from the previous season include Victor Garber, Brandon Routh, Caity Lotz, Franz Drameh, Maisie Richardson-Sellers, Amy Pemberton, Nick Zano and Dominic Purcell as Martin Stein, Ray Palmer, Sara Lance, Jefferson Jackson, Amaya Jiwe, Gideon, Nate Heywood and Mick Rory respectively. They were joined by Tala Ashe and Keiynan Lonsdale playing Zari Tomaz and Wally West, respectively. Lonsdale was previously a regular on The Flash, prior to which he had auditioned to play Jackson in Legends of Tomorrow before Drameh was cast. Garber also portrayed Martin Stein's ancestor Henry Stein in the episode "Return of the Mack". Legends of Tomorrow co-creator Marc Guggenheim explained that, part of the motivation for adding a Muslim superhero (Zari) to the series was the "political climate" in the US after the 2016 elections. Pemberton physically portrayed Gideon in the episode "Here I Go Again", unlike most episodes where she only voiced the character. This was the final season to feature Garber and Drameh as regulars; both left midway through the season, with the latter returning for the season finale, while the former left to resume his career in Broadway theatre. It also remains Lonsdale's only season as a regular as he departed after the season finale, citing his desire to seek other acting opportunities.  This was the last season to feature Richardson-Sellers as Amaya Jiwe who also departed in the season finale however she would portray a new character in the fourth season.

Arthur Darvill, who played Rip Hunter as a main cast member in the first two seasons, was demoted to a recurring cast member for the third season. Numerous actors returned in their roles from other Arrowvverse series in recurring capacity, such as Neal McDonough as Damien Darhk, David Sobolov as the voice of Grodd, Christina Brucato as Lily Stein, and Matt Ryan as John Constantine. Tracy Ifeachor was cast as Jiwe's granddaughter Kuasa, replacing Anika Noni Rose who voiced the character in the animated web series Vixen, and Courtney Ford was cast as Darhk's daughter Nora, previously played by Tuesday Hoffman on Arrow. Sellers' mother Joy Richardson recurred as Jiwe's vision quest ancestor. Wentworth Miller, who played Leonard Snart / Captain Cold as a regular in season 1 and recurred in season 2, returned to play the character's Earth-X doppelganger Leo Snart. John Noble voices Mallus, the season's main antagonist, but the character's true form is not revealed until the season's penultimate episode, "Guest Starring John Noble", where Noble also portrays himself in a guest appearance. Jes Macallan, Adam Tsekhman and Hiro Kanagawa recurred as the Time Bureau agents Ava Sharpe, Gary Green and Wilbur Bennett, respectively.

Filming 
Filming for the season began in July 2017, and ended in February 2018. "Here I Go Again" was written as the season's bottle episode, and focused mainly on Ashe's character Zari. Sellers called her experience playing a 72-year-old version of Amaya Jiwe "horrible" because of the practical elements that were involved in creating the character's look, particularly the makeup. She recalled, "I was sent to a full head cast [...] I was covered in plaster from my shoulders up with just two breathing holes for two hours. They then created a whole new face and neck for me that was glued on and spray painted over the course of four hours. The end result was freakishly convincing."

Arrowverse tie-ins 
In May 2017, The CW president Mark Pedowitz officially announced plans for a four-show Arrowverse crossover event, crossing over episodes of the television series Supergirl, The Flash, Legends of Tomorrow, and Arrow. The crossover, Crisis on Earth-X, began with Supergirl and a special airing of Arrow on November 27, 2017, and concluded on The Flash and Legends of Tomorrow on November 28.

Release

Broadcast 
The third season began airing on October 10, 2017 on The CW in the United States, and concluded on April 9, 2018.

Home media 
The season was made available for streaming on Netflix in late April 2018, soon after the season finale aired. It was released on Blu-Ray on September 25, 2018.

Reception

Ratings

Critical response 

The review aggregator website Rotten Tomatoes reported a 88% approval rating with an average rating of 7.95/10 based on 8 reviews. The website's consensus reads, "DC's Legends of Tomorrow lightens up the tone in its third season while spotlighting adventurous plots and a distinct sense of humor." Jesse Schedeen of IGN said, "while Season 3 reached some impressive highs, it also gave us some of the weakest installments of the series. Season 3 ultimately suffered from its inability to create a conflict worthy of this cast of misfit heroes, and that casts a shadow that will linger when the series returns for Season 4." Vox writer Sara Ghaleb wrote, "The goofiest corner of The CW's Arrowverse became its best self in season three".

Accolades 

|-
! scope="row" rowspan="2" | 2018
| Saturn Awards
| Best Superhero Adaptation Television Series
| Legends of Tomorrow
| 
| 
|-
| Teen Choice Awards
| Choice TV Actress: Action
| Caity Lotz
| 
| 
|}

Notes

References 

General references

External links 
 
 

2017 American television seasons
2018 American television seasons
Legends of Tomorrow seasons